Vokesimurex gallinago, common name the hen murex, is a species of sea snail, a marine gastropod mollusk in the family Muricidae, the murex snails or rock snails.

Description
The size of the shell varies between 40 mm and 100 mm.

Distribution
This Indo-Pacific marine species occurs from Mozambique to Southeast Asia and Japan.

References

 Houart R. (2014). Living Muricidae of the world. Muricinae. Murex, Promurex, Haustellum, Bolinus, Vokesimurex and Siratus. Harxheim: ConchBooks. 197 pp.

External links
 

Gastropods described in 1903
Vokesimurex